Andrew James Holmes (born November 14, 1988 in California) is an American actor, singer and composer working in musical theater, and a member of StarKid Productions.

He is known primarily for playing the role of Elder Cunningham in The Book of Mormon on Broadway, the US tour, the West End, Melbourne and Sydney.  Holmes is also a member of StarKid Productions, having composed music for four of the theatre company's shows and acted in two of them. He was the sole composer of Twisted, leading him to be most closely identified with that musical.

Early life 
Holmes grew up in Southern California and graduated from University of Michigan in 2011.

Career 
While still in college, Holmes was a founding member of StarKid Productions, co-composing the music for their first show in 2009, A Very Potter Musical, where he also was credited as the music director and played the piano in the pit orchestra. Holmes then reprised his role as co-composer, music director, and pianist for Me and My Dick later that year, as well as playing the acting role of Joey's Heart.

After graduating, Holmes was cast as Frederick Frankenstein in the US national tour of Young Frankenstein. Holmes played this role from September 30, 2011 to May 31, 2012.

In 2012, Holmes returned to StarKid for A Very Potter Senior Year. He served as co-composer, musical director, and keyboard 1 in the pit orchestra, as well as playing the role of Gilderoy Lockhart.

In 2013, Holmes was the standby for Elder Cunningham on The Book of Mormon in the Chicago, Illinois production. He also composed the music for StarKid's Twisted alongside Kaley McMahon, who wrote the lyrics.

In 2013–2014, Holmes played Cunningham on the first national tour of The Book of Mormon.

In 2014, Holmes transferred to the Broadway production of The Book of Mormon as a standby for Cunningham from January 14, 2014 to June 29, 2014. From July 28, 2014 to January 31, 2015, he played the role in the West End production of the show, replacing Jared Gertner.

In 2015–2016, Holmes embarked on the second national tour of The Book of Mormon, again reprising his role as Elder Cunningham. He played this role from February 13, 2015 to May 1, 2016.

In 2017–2018, Holmes continued playing Elder Cunningham in The Book of Mormon. He originated the role in Melbourne from its opening on January 17, 2017, until his departure on June 25, 2017. Holmes returned to the role when the production moved to the Sydney Lyric theater on February 28, 2018. Holmes departed the production on September 9, 2018.

Credits

Actor

Music

References

External links 

 
 Official Twitter

1989 births
21st-century American male actors
American male musical theatre actors
Living people
StarKid Productions members
University of Michigan alumni